Black Doom may refer to:

Black Doom, a character in the Sonic the Hedgehog games
Black doom, also known as blackened doom, a style of heavy metal that combines elements of black metal and doom metal